The following is a list of zoos and aquariums in the United Kingdom.

Zoos in the UK are legally required to be licensed by local authorities under the Zoo Licensing Act 1981, but many are also members of the British and Irish Association of Zoos and Aquariums.

List 

 Africa Alive 
 Alameda Wildlife Conservation Park
 Amazon World 
 Amazona Zoo 
 Amazonia (Strathclyde Country Park)
 ARK Wildlife Park
 Banham Zoo 
 Battersea Park Children's Zoo
 Baytree Owl and Wildlife Centre 
 Beale Park 
 Becky Falls Woodland Park 
 Belfast Zoological Gardens
 Berkshire College of Agriculture 
 Birdworld 
 Birmingham Nature Centre 
 Blackpool Zoo Park 
 Blair Drummond Safari and Adventure Park 
 Blue Planet Aquarium 
 Brent Lodge Park Animal Centre 
 Calderglen Country Park Zoo 
 Camperdown Wildlife Centre 
 Chessington World of Adventures 
 Chester Zoo 
 Chestnut Centre Conservation Park 
 Chew Valley Animal Park 
 Colchester Zoo 
 Combe Martin Wildlife and Dinosaur Park 
 Crocodiles Of The World 
 Curraghs Wildlife Park
 Dartmoor Zoological Park 
 Deep Sea World 
 The Deep 
 Drayton Manor Zoo 
 Drusillas Park 
 Dudley Zoological Gardens 
 Durrell Wildlife Park
 Eagle Heights Wildlife Foundation
 Exmoor Zoological Park 
 Five Sisters Zoo 
 Flamingo Land 
 Folly Farm 
 Gauntlet Bird of Prey - Eagle and Vulture Park 
 Gentleshaw Wildlife Centre
 Golders Hill Park Zoo 
 Hadlow College
 Harewood Bird Garden 
 Hawk Conservancy Trust 
 Hemsley Conservation Centre
 Hobbledown Ltd 
 International Centre for Birds of Prey 
 Isle of Wight Zoo
 Kent Life
 Kirkleatham Owl Centre 
 Kirkley Hall Zoological Gardens 
 Knowsley Safari Park 
 Lake District Coast Aquarium 
 Lake District Wildlife Park 
 Lakeland Wildlife Oasis 
 Lakes Aquarium
 Lincolnshire Wildlife Park 
 Linton Zoological Gardens 
 The Living Rainforest 
 London Aquarium 
 London Zoo
 Longleat Safari and Adventure Park 
 Lotherton Wildlife World 
 Mablethorpe Seal Sanctuary and Wildlife Centre 
 Manor House Wildlife Park 
 Marwell Wildlife
 Messingham Zoo 
 National Marine Aquarium 
 New Forest Wildlife Park 
 Newquay Zoo 
 Noah's Ark Zoo Farm
 Oceanarium 
 Old MacDonald's Farm & Fun Park
 Paignton Zoo
 Paradise Wildlife Park 
 Peak Wildlife Park 
 Pensthorpe 
 Raptor Foundation 
 Reaseheath College 
 Riverside Garden
 Edinburgh Zoo 
 Highland Wildlife Park 
 Sealife Adventure 
 Sea Life Park Weymouth 
 Shaldon Wildlife Trust 
 Shepreth Wildlife Park
 Skegness Aquarium
 Skegness Natureland Seal Sanctuary 
 Sparsholt College Hampshire
 Tattershall Farm Park 
 The Scottish Deer Centre 
 Thrigby Hall Wildlife Gardens 
 Tilgate Nature Centre 
 Tropical Butterfly House 
 Tropical World
 Tropiquaria Wildlife Park 
 Twycross Zoo 
 UK Wolf Conservation Trust 
 Welsh Mountain Zoo - National Zoological Society of Wales 
 West Midland Safari & Leisure Park 
 Whipsnade Zoo
 Wildlife Heritage Foundation 
 Wildwood Trust 
 Williamson Park 
 Wingham Wildlife Park
 Woburn Safari Park 
 Woodside Wildlife and Falconry Park 
 WWT Arundel 
 WWT Castle Espie 
 WWT Llanelli Wetland Centre 
 WWT London Wetland Centre 
 WWT Martin Mere 
 WWT Slimbridge 
 WWT Washington 
 Yorkshire Wildlife Park

Sources 

Zoos in the United Kingdom
United Kingdom
Zoo
Zoological gardens and aquariums